Christ Cathedral (Latin: Cathedralis Christi; Spanish: Catedral de Cristo; Vietnamese: Nhà Thờ Chính Tòa Chúa Kitô), formerly and informally known as the Crystal Cathedral, is an American church building of the Diocese of Orange, located in Garden Grove, California. The reflective glass building, by the firm of Philip Johnson/John Burgee Architects, seats 2,248 people. The church was touted as "the largest glass building in the world" when it was completed in 1981. The building has one of the largest musical instruments in the world, the Hazel Wright Organ.

From 1981 to 2013, the building was the principal place of worship for Crystal Cathedral Ministries (now Shepherd's Grove), a congregation of the Reformed Church in America, founded in 1955 by Robert H. Schuller. Crystal Cathedral Ministries filed for bankruptcy in October 2010 and in February 2012 sold the building and its adjacent campus to the Diocese of Orange for use as the diocese's new cathedral. The building, especially the interior, was renovated by Johnson Fain to accommodate the Catholic liturgy.

Following the completion of construction, the building was consecrated and formally renamed "Christ Cathedral", the seat of the Diocese of Orange, on July 17, 2019.

History

Origins and construction
The Garden Grove Community Church was founded in 1955 by Robert H. Schuller and his wife Arvella. A congregation of the Reformed Church in America, the church first held services in space rented from the Orange Drive-In Theatre.

The congregation moved to the present Christ Cathedral campus in 1961, erecting a building now known as the Arboretum, designed by architect Richard Neutra, as its initial sanctuary. In 1968, the congregation completed the Tower of Hope to provide office and classroom space but continued growth led to the need for a new sanctuary. Schuller commissioned the firm of Philip Johnson/John Burgee Architects to design the sanctuary.

Construction of the Crystal Cathedral began in 1977 and was completed in 1980, built at a cost of $18 million (equivalent to $ million in ) . The signature rectangular panes of glass comprising the building are not bolted to the structure; they are glued to it using a silicone-based glue. This and other measures are intended to allow the building to withstand an earthquake of magnitude 8.0. The building was constructed using over 10,000 rectangular panes of glass.

Upon moving from the old Neutra sanctuary to the new Johnson/Burgee sanctuary in 1981, the congregation changed its name to the "Crystal Cathedral" – an alliteration derived from the appearance of the building (though the building was not constructed with crystal glass). The congregation added the Prayer Spire in 1990.

2010 bankruptcy

Beginning in 2010, creditors of Crystal Cathedral Ministries filed lawsuits to collect money due to them for providing goods, services and broadcasting The Hour of Power weekly TV show. A board member said that the total debt was $55 million.

The church's board filed for bankruptcy October 18, 2010, citing $43 million in debt including a $36 million mortgage and $7.5 million in other debt. Church officials said that they had been trying to negotiate payments but after several suits were filed and writs of attachment were granted, the church had to declare bankruptcy.

The church received offers from a real estate investment group and nearby Chapman University.

Purchase by the Diocese of Orange

On July 7, 2011, the Diocese of Orange, which had previously purchased land and started planning for construction of a new and larger cathedral in Santa Ana because growth of the diocese had rendered Holy Family Cathedral in Orange too small for diocesan functions, announced that it was "potentially interested" in buying the Crystal Cathedral campus for future use as its diocesan cathedral. There were three major factors that motivated the interest of the Diocese of Orange in the property:

 Its central location within the diocese made it more accessible to parishioners than the Santa Ana site,
 The cost of renovating the Crystal Cathedral building for Catholic worship would be far less than that of constructing a new building from scratch, and
 The other buildings on the campus would provide facilities for diocesan administrative offices and ministries with little modification, further reducing the cost of the whole project.

The diocese increased its initial offer of $50 million to $53.6 million, which included a lease-back provision at below market rates for a period of time.  On November 17, 2011, a federal judge approved selling the Crystal Cathedral to the Diocese of Orange for $57.5 million (equivalent to $ million in ) .

Days after the judge's ruling, Italian newspaper La Stampa used a picture of the Crystal Cathedral to illustrate an article reporting on the establishment of a Vatican commission "to put a stop to garage style churches, boldly shaped structures that risk denaturing modern places for Catholic worship". The Vatican approved the use of the building two weeks after the judge's ruling.

The sale to the diocese was finalized on February 3, 2012. Under the terms, Crystal Cathedral Ministries was allowed to lease most of the campus including the church for up to three years; the diocese offered Crystal Cathedral Ministries a longer-term lease at nearby St. Callistus Church. The diocese transferred the parish to the Crystal Cathedral campus and renamed it Christ Cathedral Parish.  The transfer of the cemetery located on the campus was immediate, and the diocese established offices on the campus soon after. Tod Brown, Bishop of Orange at the time, stated that the diocese would hire an architect to renovate the interior of the facility to make it suitable for the Catholic liturgy, but that it did not intend to substantially change the exterior.

On June 9, 2012, the diocese announced that the building would be known as "Christ Cathedral" when it became the diocese's new cathedral, and that Fr. Christopher Smith will be rector and episcopal vicar. The church's new patronal name was designated by the Holy See, while suggestions were also taken from the diocese and its members. In October 2012, the diocese held its first event at the cathedral, the 7th Orange County Catholic Prayer Breakfast. Prayer was held as part of the event, but the diocese did not celebrate Mass in the cathedral building until its solemn dedication after completion of the renovation. In the interim, the former St. Callistus Parish, which had relocated to the campus from its previous campus a couple blocks away and officially assumed the name Christ Cathedral Parish, held its Masses and other liturgies in the building known as The Arboretum—the same building that had served as the sanctuary church for Schuller's congregation before the opening of the new cathedral building in 1981.

Crystal Cathedral Ministries held its final worship service in the Crystal Cathedral building on June 30, 2013. That congregation held its first service at the campus of the former St. Callistus Church, which it renamed Shepherd's Grove, on July 7, 2013. The new location is 12921 Lewis Street at Garden Grove Boulevard, one mile south of the Crystal Cathedral. At the same time, St. Callistus Parish moved to the Crystal Cathedral campus, worshipping in the Arboretum until the completion of the renovations to the cathedral building. St. Callistus Catholic school moved into the former Crystal Cathedral Academy facility, changing its name to Christ Cathedral Academy, in September 2013.

Renovation and 2019 consecration

On September 24, 2014, the diocese released its proposed redesign plans for the building, created by Johnson Fain, including extensive changes to the interior intended to make the building more suitable for the "altar-centered" Catholic ritual while retaining some qualities of the original design. Among the changes, the glass walls will be lined with angled "petals" that will reduce the amount of outside light, deemed as distracting from the altar. At the same time, the petals will include exterior lights to enhance the building's visibility at night, producing an effect described as a "box of stars". The route from the parking lot to the plaza will be lined with crape myrtle trees, symbolizing the "beginning" of holiness in progression to the altar. The Hazel Wright Organ was disassembled and shipped back to Italy for an extensive restoration; it was also painted white so that it will not distract from the altar. To reflect the diversity of the Catholic community in the region, the reliquary of its altar will conceal donated first-class relics connected to saints of American, Korean, Mexican and Vietnamese descent, including the Canadian Martyrs, Andrew Dũng-Lạc, Junípero Serra, Andrew Kim Taegon, and Rafael Guízar y Valencia.

From the proceeds of a "For Christ Forever" fundraising campaign held in 2012, the diocese allocated $59 million towards the cost of renovating the cathedral. In 2014, an anonymous benefactor contributed $20 million in additional funding. However, it was later found that the estimates were reached without "serious study or professional recommendations"; in July 2016, it was estimated that the total cost of the renovations, as originally planned, would actually be $108 million. The diocese established a taskforce to reduce the cost of the project to $72 million, which was accomplished by using a marble veneer altar instead of solid marble, using a lower-cost source of stone of an equivalent quality rather than importing it from Italy, and planning to "keep the bones of the building intact". On May 25, 2017, the diocese signed general contractor Snyder Langston for the renovation, with construction slated to begin on June 1, 2017, and expected to be completed by late-2018.

On June 29, 2018, the Bishop of Orange, Kevin Vann, proclaimed a "holy year of preparation" ahead of the consecration. The formal dedication Mass was held on July 17, 2019; at that time, Vann solemnly dedicated the former Crystal Cathedral building as Christ Cathedral and the building canonically assumed that name. A formal celebration event and Pacific Symphony concert was held on July 13, 2019, ahead of the dedication Mass.

The shrine of Our Lady of La Vang was installed on the grounds in 2021. The  statue of the Virgin Mary is capped by a spiraling canopy.

Organ

The church's Hazel Wright Organ is the fifth largest pipe organ in the world, with 273 ranks and five manuals. Constructed by Fratelli Ruffatti based on specifications by Virgil Fox and expanded by Frederick Swann, the instrument incorporates the large Aeolian-Skinner pipe organ built in 1962 for New York's Philharmonic Hall (now David Geffen Hall), and the Ruffatti organ which had been installed in the church's previous sanctuary. Swann was organist at the Crystal Cathedral from 1982 to 1998. Following the Crystal Cathedral's final Hour of Power in June 2013, the organ was dismantled for a $2 million refurbishing led by Ruffatti. Re-installation of the renovated organ was completed in early 2020. Re-voicing was put on hiatus due to the Covid-19 pandemic and resumed at the end of 2021 and the organ's restoration was completed on February 7, 2022. The organ is now regularly used during weekend Mass services. The re-dedication concert featuring Hector Olivera was held September 30, 2022.

See also

List of Catholic cathedrals in the United States
List of cathedrals in the United States

References

External links

 

Buildings and structures in Garden Grove, California
Churches in Orange County, California
Culture of Garden Grove, California
Futurist architecture
Philip Johnson buildings
Postmodern architecture in California
Reformed Church in America churches
Christian organizations established in 1955
Roman Catholic cathedrals in California
1955 establishments in California
Roman Catholic churches completed in 1980
20th-century Roman Catholic church buildings in the United States